Sunil Kumar Gupta (7 July 1914 – 29 April 2009) was a Jatiya Party (Ershad) politician and the former Member of Parliament of Barisal-1 and Barisal-5. He was the organizer of the Liberation War of Bangladesh.

Early life 
Sunil Kumar Gupta was born on 7 July 1914 in Barisal District.

Career 
Gupta was elected a member of parliament from Barisal-5 as a Bangladesh Nationalist Party candidate in 1979 Bangladeshi general election. He was elected to parliament from Barisal-1 as a Jatiya Party candidate in 1986 and 1988. He served as the cabinet minister in several ministry during Bangladesh Nationalist party and Jatiya Party (1979 to 1990).

Personal life 
Sunil Gupta was married to Mrs Kamala Gupta and left behind four sons, two daughters and fourteen grandchildren. His Eldest son, Mr Samir Gupta is an esteemed businessman, managing director of one of the leading garments factories of Bangladesh. His 2nd Son Dr. Ashok Kumar Gupta is the chairman of Bangladesh Trading Corporation- BTC Group, who is the permanent member of UN Info academy.

Death 
Sunil Kumar Gupta died on 29 April 2009. On April 30, his funeral took place at his ancestral home in Barisal.

References 

Jatiya Party politicians
1914 births
2009 deaths
3rd Jatiya Sangsad members
4th Jatiya Sangsad members
2nd Jatiya Sangsad members